Leah Janessa Hernandez Larot (born 26 August 1989) is a Filipino women's international footballer who plays as a forward. She is a member of the Philippines women's national football team and was part of the team that competed in the 2018 AFC Women's Asian Cup.

College career
Leah Larot played for the Sacramento State Hornets, the women's soccer team of her college, California State University, Sacramento. Entering her senior year, Larot has played 62 games for the Hornets, starting as a forward for 29 of those games. In her senior year, she was named as the Sacramento State Hornets' Best Female Athlete due to her role in helping her team win the Big Sky Conference for the second time in four years. She was also named as part of the First Team all-Big Sky Conference for that season.

Club career
In 2018, Larot played for the now-defunct Fresno FC in the Women's Premier Soccer League's Coastal Conference.

International career
Larot has played for the Philippine national team and is eligible to represent the country through her Filipino father. She was part of the squad that participated at the 2018 AFC Women's Asian Cup in Jordan.

She also has a younger sister, Raylene who has also played for Sacramento State and has received a call up to the Philippine national team.

References

1989 births
Living people
Filipino women's footballers
Philippines women's international footballers
Place of birth missing (living people)
Women's association football forwards
California State University, Sacramento alumni
American sportspeople of Filipino descent
Women's Premier Soccer League players